Magister Martinus von Biberach (died 1498) was a theologian from Heilbronn, Germany. He is mostly remembered because of a priamel that has allegedly been his epitaph.

Epitaph

Reception
While the attribution of the poem to Biberach is controversial, it has been cited and modified widely. Martin Luther in particular took issue with it, offering a contrary version in a sermon on John 8:46-59 for Judica Sunday: Ich lebe, so lang Gott will, / ich sterbe, wann und wie Gott will, / ich fahr und weiß gewiß, wohin, / mich wundert, daß ich traurig bin!

Notes

Further reading
 Gerd Dicke: Mich wundert, das ich so fröhlich bin. Ein Spruch in Gebrauch, In: Kleinstformen der Literatur, hg. v. Walter Haug u. Burghart Wachinger, Tübingen 1994 (Fortuna vitrea 14), S._56-90.  ISSN 0938-9660

1498 deaths
German poets
Year of birth unknown
German male poets